Ivica Gligorovski  (born 15 April 1981) is a Macedonian football player who currently is coaching in his own youth academy.

Gligorovski has twice been the top scorer of the First Macedonian Football League, scoring 15 goals during the 2007–08 and 14 goals during the 2008–09 season, with FK Milano Kumanovo.

International career
Gligorovski has made 3 appearances for the Macedonia national football team, making his debut as a second-half substitute in a friendly against Croatia on 9 February 2003. His final international was a January 2004 friendly match against China.

References

External links

1981 births
Living people
Association football forwards
Macedonian footballers
North Macedonia international footballers
FK Borec players
FK Sileks players
Ethnikos Achna FC players
FK Vardar players
FK Milano Kumanovo players
FK Makedonija Gjorče Petrov players
FK Teteks players
FK Bregalnica Štip players
Macedonian First Football League players
Cypriot First Division players
Macedonian expatriate footballers
Expatriate footballers in Cyprus
Macedonian expatriate sportspeople in Cyprus